Peaceful as Hell is the fourth studio album by Canadian noise pop duo Black Dresses. It was released on April 13, 2020, the two-year anniversary of their first studio album Wasteisolation, under Blacksquares Records. It was preceded by  the lead single of the album "Creep U" which was released on April 7. The album was the duo's last album before their announced disbandment in May 2020 due to harassment of the band following their unexpected success on platforms such as TikTok. Despite this, they released a follow-up record, Forever in Your Heart, the following year.

Style and themes 
Musically, Peaceful as Hell is an electronic album with elements of industrial, noise, glitch, indie rock, pop and pop-punk music. The album contains features such as heavy metal riffs, white noise, compression, and narration. It also explores themes such as apocalypse, self-knowledge, being transgender, dissociation, climate change, and social connection.

Reception 

In a positive review for Pitchfork, Leah Mandel felt the album was more accessible than previous Black Dresses albums and described it as "fun and loud as hell", concluding "Especially with the world’s hellishness currently blaring at us, every social disparity spotlighted and exacerbated, loneliness and doubt deepened to an extreme degree, Peaceful as Hell is perfect medicine." The album was Canadian rapper Backxwash's favourite album of 2020. Writing for Complex, she described the album as "incredibly sincere and very deliberate" and said that "The lyrical content can be unsettling at times, but the instrumentation gives you hope, as a listener, almost as if it is saying, "Life can be hard, but there is light at the end of the tunnel."" Anthony Fantano of The Needle Drop said of the album "Black Dresses mercilessly kills us with kindness on Peaceful as Hell", later placing it in third place on his list of the best albums of 2020.

The song "Mirrorgirl" was included in The Fader's 20 best electronic songs April 2020 list.

Accolades

Track listing

References

2020 albums
Transgender-related music